Commatica stygia is a moth in the family Gelechiidae. It was described by Edward Meyrick in 1922. It is found in Amazonas, Brazil.

The forewings are dark fuscous with a faint interrupted fine whitish line from three-fourths of the costa to the tornus, acutely angulated in the middle and very near the margins throughout. The hindwings are dark grey with a grey expansible hair-pencil lying in the disc from the base to the middle.

References

Commatica
Moths described in 1922